"Gypsy Roadhog" is a song by the British rock band Slade, released in 1977 as the only single from the band's seventh studio album Whatever Happened to Slade. It was written by lead vocalist Noddy Holder and bassist Jim Lea, and produced by Chas Chandler. It reached No. 48 in the UK.

Background
Having returned from the US in late 1976, Slade found the UK music business much changed from when they had left in 1975 to try and crack the American market. Punk rock had exploded to become the dominant influence on youth culture and the music press. Upon their return, the band began recording their new album Whatever Happened to Slade, and in January 1977, "Gypsy Roadhog" was released as the lead single. After performing the song on the children's television show Blue Peter, complaints about the song's lyrics saw the song largely removed from the Radio 1 playlist. As a result, the single stalled at No. 48, and remained in the charts for only two weeks. Whatever Happened to Slade was released in March but failed to chart.

The song's lyrics depicted the tale of a cocaine dealer in America. In a 1989 interview on Sky by Day, Holder recalled of the song and its banning: "The song was all about a cocaine dealer in America, but it was actually an anti-drug song. The next day in all the newspapers, Keith Richards had just been arrested for cocaine and there's all things in the paper about using silver spoons and everything. Blue Peter went berserk when they found out the song was about cocaine, 'cause it had already gone out then. Radio One banned the record and it sank without a trace."

Release
"Gypsy Roadhog" was released on 7" vinyl by Barn Records in the UK, Ireland, Belgium and Germany. It was the first Slade single to be released on Barn, which was owned by the band's manager Chas Chandler. The B-side, "Forest Full of Needles", was exclusive to the single and would later appear on the band's 2007 compilation B-Sides.

Promotion
The band performed the song on Top of the Pops, Supersonic and also Blue Peter. In a 1986 fan club interview, Lea recalled that the BBC demanded Slade alter the words for the performance of the song on the show. Despite the change of lyrics, complaints were still received and the single received little play on Radio 1. The band's performance on Top of the Pops would not surface again until January 2012 when it was fully played on BBC4.

Critical reception
Upon release, Record Mirror felt the song suggested that there had been "no musical progression in the last two years". New Musical Express said the song makes "all the right sounds and even has a toe tapping beat", but failed to live up to the band's previous work. They concluded: "It could give them that desperately needed American hit, but as far as these isles are concerned, it's just the latest step in their continuing irrelevance." Melody Maker felt the song was "above average" and had "chart potential". In a review of Whatever Happened to Slade, Record Mirror felt the album was similar to "Gypsy Roadhog" as "solid, rocking numbers", but not as "distinctive" as the band's previous work.

Track listing
7" Single
"Gypsy Roadhog" - 3:20
"Forest Full of Needles" - 3:30

Chart performance

Personnel
Slade
Noddy Holder - lead vocals, rhythm guitar
Dave Hill - lead guitar, backing vocals
Jim Lea - bass, backing vocals
Don Powell - drums

Additional personnel
Chas Chandler - producer

References

1977 singles
Slade songs
Songs written by Noddy Holder
Songs written by Jim Lea
Song recordings produced by Chas Chandler
1977 songs
Songs about cocaine
Songs banned by the BBC